= Arilla (Lydia) =

Village of ancient Lydia

Coordinates: 38°37′40″N 28°05′11″E

Arilla was a village of ancient Lydia, inhabited during Roman times. Its site is located near Hacıhasankıranı in Asiatic Turkey.

== History ==
=== Iron Age ===
==== Lydian period ====
Arilla was originally a town in the Kingdom of Lydia.

=== Classical Age ===
==== Roman period ====
The village was allowed to hold an annual seven-day fair in September from the year 134-135 by Titus Aurelius Fulvus Boionius, then governor of Asia.
